Novozhilovo is the name of three different rural localities in Russia:
Novozhilovo, Leningrad Oblast, a village in Sosnovskoye Rural Settlement of Priozersky District, Leningrad Oblast
Novozhilovo, Perm Krai, a village in Levichanskoye Rural Settlement of Kosinsky District, Perm Krai
Novozhilovo, Vladimir Oblast, a village in Karinskoye Rural Settlement of Alexandrovsky District, Vladimir Oblast

See also
Novozhilov, a Russian last name
Novozhilova, a rural locality in Kudymkarsky District, Perm Krai